Duke Krok is a legendary figure in Czech history, being the first judge, or duke, of the Czech people. He was also the father of Princess Libuše and her sisters Kazi and Teta.

The Cosmas Chronicle 
Perhaps the earliest mention of the Duke (as "Crocco") is in the Chronica Boëmorum, which was originally written in Latin. After Cosmas describes the manner of the first inhabitants of Bohemia, whom at first lived very simply, did not know alcohol, marriages, private property or weapons. After a time, however, they then began to flourish injustice and envy. And, according to Cosmas, the people had "neither the judge nor the prince". So, Krok rose amongst the people, who was described by Cosmas as "a man known for his age, absolutely perfect, rich and worldly in his judgements, and sophisticated. This wonderful man had no male heirs, but rather three daughters, whom nature had granted the treasures of wisdom".

However, this is the last Cosmas says of Krok, except to describe his daughters and their own exploits. Later chroniclers would expand upon this, for example, Václav Hájek of Libočany, who writes about the death of Forefather Čech. He writes that when Čech died he tried to pass the leading of the Czech people to his brother Lech, who refused, and recommended Krok in his place. He also wrote that Krok transferred his seat to Vyšehrad in 683.

History 
František Palacký argued that the figure of Krok was influenced by the ruler Sámo; however, other authors, eager to prove a supposed Celtic origin of the Czech people, have been quick to say that the name Krok may have arisen from the Celtic name Crocco. Other theorists suggest a connection with Prince Krak, the mythical founder of Kraków.

References 

Přemyslid dynasty
Czech culture
Czech mythology
Fictional Czech people